Alfred Agache may refer to:
 Alfred Agache (painter) (1843–1915), French painter
 Alfred Agache (architect) (1875–1934), French architect and urban designer